Jassim bin Hamad Stadium is an association football stadium in Al Rayyan, Qatar, located about  west from the centre of Doha. It is the home of the Al Sadd Sports Club's association football team, who play in the top-flight Qatar Stars League, and is occasionally used by the Qatar men's and women's national football teams as one of their home grounds. Named after the then-Qatari Minister of Youth and Sports Jassim bin Hamad bin Abdullah Al Thani, who had provided permission for Al Sadd's founding members to form the group in 1969, the stadium was opened in 1975, and has since been renovated twice; once for the 17th Arabian Gulf Cup in 2004, and again in 2010. In addition to hosting all matches of the Arabian Gulf Cup in 2004, the stadium has hosted numerous international association football matches throughout its history, including matches of the 2019 FIFA Club World Cup, the football tournaments at the 2006 Asian Games and 2011 Pan Arab Games, and two editions of the Italian super cup, the Supercoppa Italiana.

Facilities 
Aside from the main field, the stadium area also accommodates an administration office, a cafe, a mosque, workers' quarters, an athletics track, training fields, a swimming pool and a multi-sports hall. The multi-sports hall has a capacity of 1,000 people, and is used for local tournaments in basketball, volleyball, handball and other sports and events.

Important tournaments held in the stadium 
The Arabian Gulf Cup
The Arabian Gulf Cup final match was played on this stadium when Qatar defeated Oman on penalties and won the title, the final ceremony was held there.

The 15th Asian Games Doha 2006
The final of the football tournament of the Games was held there when Qatar defeated Iraq by one goal and won the title.

Qatar Stars League
As this is Al Sadd's home stadium they play their home league matches there and in the 2009–2010 season it was shared with the other Qatari side Al Ahli. And when ever Al Sadd scores a goal a sound of a wolf howling comes out of the stadium's speakers because the clubs nick or mascot is the wolf.

Qatar national football team matches
The Qatari football team plays its important matches there such as the World Cup qualifiers matches there.

Qatar Heir Apparent's Cup
All the matches of this cup are played on the same stadium because this cup is only made up of two semi-finals and a final match.
Qatar's Emir Cup
The semi-final matches are played on these stadiums while the quarter final matches and round of sixteen matches are played in the Grand Hamad Stadium and the final match is played in the Khalifa Stadium.

Supercoppa Italiana
The Stadium hosted the 2014 Supercoppa Italiana in a match involving Juventus (Serie A champions) and Napoli (Coppa Italia champions). The Stadium hosted the 2016 Supercoppa Italiana in a match involving Juventus (Serie A champions) and Milan (Coppa Italia Vice-champions).

The stadium hosted three matches during the 2019 FIFA Club World Cup.

During the 2022 FIFA World Cup, France used the stadium as their training base.

Recent tournament results

2019 FIFA Club World Cup

References 

Football venues in Qatar
Sports venues in Doha
Multi-purpose stadiums in Qatar
Al Sadd SC
Sports venues completed in 1974